The 1936 24 Hours of Le Mans was originally planned to be the 14th Grand Prix of Endurance to be held on 14 and 15 June 1936. However, France was in the middle of the turmoil and civil unrest sweeping over Europe.
A general strike across the country in the wake of the recent electoral victory of the Popular Front had only been resolved days before scrutineering was due to start.
In response to the dominance of the German teams in grand prix racing, the Automobile Club de France (ACF) had chosen to run their Grand Prix to a sports-car formula, which would in turn be eligible to run at Le Mans. Owing to the strikes, many of the teams had been unable to prepare their cars sufficiently, and even such matters as getting fuel, transportation or fuel for entrants and spectators would be difficult.

Therefore, at the beginning of June, the ACO organisers postponed the race. However, at the end of the month, being unable to arrange a suitable alternative date later in the year with the motorsport governing body (the AIACR), the event was cancelled.

A very competitive field of 58 cars had been filed prior to the cancellation. It included new French works teams from Talbot, Delahaye and Delage to take on the proven privateers driving Alfa Romeo, Lagonda and Bugatti cars.

Regulations
The AIACR had introduced the new 750 kg Grand Prix Formula in 1934. It had taken a year, but the state-sponsored German teams of Mercedes-Benz and Auto Union now dominated racing. The formerly pre-eminent teams of Alfa Romeo, Maserati and Bugatti had tried to compete but were quite out-classed. After two years with no success, the Automobile Club de France (ACF) decided not to hold the French Grand Prix to the AIACR formula. That meant, of course, that it was no longer part of the European Championship, but in a period of growing international tensions, the ACF wanted to return French national pride in their motorsport.
Their answer was to run the Grand Prix to its own, new regulations – open to two-seater, open-top cars matching the manufacturers' public purchase catalogues. There were no limits placed on engine-capacity nor weight, however supercharging was prohibited. At least 20 had to have been built by January 1, 1936, or in the process of being built.

This was strongly supported by French motor-industry and followed a similar ban on supercharged cars by the British RAC for the 1934 International Tourist Trophy. The Le Mans race was schedule two weeks before the French Grand Prix and the Automobile Club de l'Ouest (ACO) promptly ratified that ACF-regulation cars would be given entry. They did choose to keep the racing-classes from the previous year. They also allowed superchargers, but raised the equivalency calculation of capacity from x1.4 to x1.6.

Entries
The changes by the ACF in turn provided the incentive for probably the strongest Le Mans entry list to date. This meant that French cars once again had the very real prospect of outright victory. A dozen cars came from the ACF regulations – from Delahaye, Delage and Talbot-Lago. The new Bugatti was not ready though. Of the 58 cars, fully 30 could be classed as works, or works-supported, entries, representing 13 manufacturers. It also saw the entry of Adler, only the second German manufacturer to enter Le Mans. 
From the previous year’s race, there were sixteen cars entering for the Coupe Bienniale.

Official Entry list
List taken from Quentin Spurring’s book, officially licensed by the ACO. It references the ACO archives which had a provisional numbering by an official. Normally sorted by engine capacity, there are several cars out of the regular sequence that would have been corrected for the final race entry list.

 
Note *: equivalent class for supercharging, with x1.6 modifier to engine capacity.

Disruption and cancellation
Throughout the mid-1930s, France had been undergoing major political upheaval – as had much of Europe, as opinions became more polarised to fascist and communist groups. Unemployment, inflation, class inequality and military friction with Germany all contributed to the violent unrest. In the general election in May, it was the popular Front coalition of leftist parties that swept into power under Léon Blum.
The second mass general strike occurred on 26 May to pressure the new government to pass sweeping reforms. Over two million workers from all over the country, including from the automobile factories, walked off the job for better work conditions. The strikes spread until five million workers were involved. However, there were no major riots. Ettore Bugatti was shut out of his own factory at Molsheim and the new car for the ACF could not be readied in time for Le Mans. At the occupied Renault plant there were 25,000 strikers who were kept in high spirits by a fine Senegalese men's choir.

By the time the government was able to negotiate a settlement it was 7 June. This was only three days before the nominal start of race-scrutineering. Faced with fuel shortages and the prospect that many entrants, and spectators, would be unable to get transport, accommodation or even food for the event, the ACO therefore announced that the race would be postponed. There was also the issue of having sufficient workers to prepare the public roads used for the circuit and getting officials and marshals to run the event.

They approached the AIACR with several rescheduled dates – the following weekend, and the first weekend of August. However, both weekends were vetoed by the Royal Automobile Club (RAC) who had their own "international" (albeit minor) events on at the same times. The AIACR was swayed by the British group and blocked the submissions. Without any other potential options, the ACO officially cancelled the Le Mans race on 23 June.
The French Grand Prix was held just five days later, run to the new formula. Raymond Sommer and Jean-Pierre Wimille won the 8-hour race with the new Bugatti Type 57G ahead of four Delahayes. In mid-July, Spain erupted in civil war, and abruptly motorsport was not important for an anxious and nervous Europe. The new French works teams would have to wait a year to test themselves against the proven experience of the Alfa Romeo and Lagonda privateers.

References
Citations

Bibliography
 Clarke, R.M. - editor (1998)    Le Mans ‘The Bentley & Alfa Years 1923-1939’    Cobham, Surrey: Brooklands Books  
 Clausager, Anders (1982)    Le Mans    London: Arthur Barker Ltd  
 Laban, Brian (2001)    Le Mans 24 Hours    London: Virgin Books   
 Spurring, Quentin (2017)    Le Mans 1930-39    Sherbourne, Dorset: Evro Publishing

External links
 Racing Sports Cars – Le Mans 24 Hours 1936 entries, results, technical detail. Retrieved 20 Sep 2022
 Le Mans History – entries, results incl. photos, hourly positions. Retrieved 20 Sep 2022
 World Sports Racing Prototypes – results, reserve entries & chassis numbers. Retrieved 20 Sep 2022
 Radio Le Mans – Race article and review by Charles Dressing. Retrieved 20 Sep 2022
 Unique Cars & Parts – results & reserve entries. Retrieved 20 Sep 2022
 Formula 2 – Le Mans results & reserve entries. Retrieved 20 Sep 2022

24 Hours of Le Mans races
Le Mans
1936 in French motorsport